Diarmuid Kilgallen (born 3 August 2000) is an Irish rugby union player, currently playing for Pro14 and European Rugby Champions Cup side Connacht. He plays in the  wing.

Connacht
Kilgallen made his debut for Connacht in the final round of the 2019–20 Pro14 against Munster, being announced as a late replacement in the starting 15 for Matt Healy. He was also named in the Ireland U20s side for 2020 U20 Six Nations.

References

External links
itsrugby.co.uk Profile

2000 births
Living people
Irish rugby union players
Connacht Rugby players
Rugby union wings
Rugby union players from County Kildare